Sylvain Saudan (born 23 September 1936 in Lausanne, Switzerland) is an extreme skier, dubbed "skier of the impossible." He is noted for skiing down large and steep mountains, including those in the Himalayas. In 2007 he survived a helicopter crash in Kashmir.

He is considered to be the father of extreme skiing and that has given him the name "skier of the impossible". He has the most difficult 18 descents to his credit. In mountains people are usually known for first ascent of high and difficult peaks but he is famous for first descents (see French Wikipedia). In 1969 he skied Monte Rosa, and Mount Hood in 1971. In 1970 he skied the W flank of the Eiger. He has climbed then skied back down the SW face of Denali (Mount McKinley), Alaska, the highest mountain in North America, in 1972; Mont Blanc in 1968, the highest mountain in the Alps; Kilimanjaro, the highest mountain in Africa; Nun peak in the Himalayas in 1976; and a number of other peaks in Nepal and the Karakoram. On his 50th birthday he skied down Japan's Mount Fuji, without snow, on scree. Saudan's crowning achievement came in 1982 when, at age 46, he skied down Pakistan's -high Gasherbrum I, or Hidden Peak, in the Himalayas. It was, and possibly still is, the longest 50-degree ski descent ever accomplished and likely the first full descent of an '8,000 meter' mountain.

In order to safely ski these mountains he developed a new technique to "jump turn" on very steep inclines. Normal jump turns would have accelerated the skier and thrown him too far down the mountain so, using long ski poles, Saudan turned by planting a ski pole downhill and, keeping his weight on both skis and leaning back on his heels, he lifted the ski tips up and swivelled them in an arc into the turn. These turns, rhythmically swivelling the skis in arcs left and right, he christened the windscreen wiper turns.

He is an accomplished guide for heliskiing, one of the first European guides, along with Hans Gmoser, to exploit the Bugaboos in British Columbia in the 1970s, with waist deep powder snow (often 150,000 vertical feet per week or more). He later developed his own line of skis suited for powder skiing. These were relatively short and wide metal skis, designed to be quick turning in powder snow, as well as to be easily loaded outside the helicopters.

His extreme exploits involved considerable preparations, studying the mountain, the snow, and the terrain over an extended period of time.

Saudan is now a motivational speaker for corporate executives, using his films to demonstrate the leap in courage it takes to conquer new peaks and new challenges.

Quotes
 I don't live for the mountain. I couldn't live without her. I live with her. (in Dreyfus, p. 31).
 When you ski down a corridor, you're really edging death with each move that is not perfectly controlled. There's really only one way out: don't fall down. (in Dreyfus, p. 270).

References

External links
 SKI magazine - The father of extreme skiing - Jan-2009 - p. 86. Subscription required.

Swiss male alpine skiers
Extreme skiers
1936 births
Living people